Casebrook is a suburb on the northern side of Christchurch city. 

The land was farmed by Walter Case (1881?-1961). When Casebrook Intermediate was built in 1966, it combined his name with the presence of a stream near the school. The suburb developed subsequently and took its name from the school. There is a Walter Case Drive in the suburb.

Demographics

Casebrook, comprising the statistical areas of Casebrook and Regents Park, had a population of 5,262 at the 2018 New Zealand census, an increase of 291 people (5.9%) since the 2013 census, and an increase of 369 people (7.5%) since the 2006 census. There were 1,941 households. There were 2,547 males and 2,721 females, giving a sex ratio of 0.94 males per female, with 933 people (17.7%) aged under 15 years, 1,059 (20.1%) aged 15 to 29, 2,409 (45.8%) aged 30 to 64, and 867 (16.5%) aged 65 or older.

Ethnicities were 85.7% European/Pākehā, 8.2% Māori, 2.5% Pacific peoples, 10.5% Asian, and 2.6% other ethnicities (totals add to more than 100% since people could identify with multiple ethnicities).

The proportion of people born overseas was 19.6%, compared with 27.1% nationally.

Although some people objected to giving their religion, 49.4% had no religion, 40.2% were Christian, 0.8% were Hindu, 0.9% were Muslim, 0.6% were Buddhist and 2.1% had other religions.

Of those at least 15 years old, 867 (20.0%) people had a bachelor or higher degree, and 771 (17.8%) people had no formal qualifications. The employment status of those at least 15 was that 2,226 (51.4%) people were employed full-time, 666 (15.4%) were part-time, and 138 (3.2%) were unemployed.

Education
Casebrook Intermediate is an intermediate school catering for years 7 to 8.

References

Suburbs of Christchurch
Populated places in Canterbury, New Zealand